Vino SKO Team is a Kazakhstani UCI Continental cycling team established in 2014. The name of the team refers to Kazakh cyclist Alexander Vinokourov.

Team roster

Major wins

2015
 National Road Race Championships, Oleg Zemlyakov
Stage 1 Tour of Iran (Azerbaijan), Alexandr Shushemoin
2016
 Overall Tour de Filipinas, Oleg Zemlyakov
Stage 2, Oleg Zemlyakov
Stage 2 Tour de Taiwan, Stepan Astafyev
Stage 6 Tour of Iran (Azerbaijan), Yevgeniy Gidich
Stage 6 Tour de Korea, Zhandos Bizhigitov
2017
 Overall The Princess Maha Chackri Sirindhorn's Cup 'Tour of Thailand', Yevgeniy Gidich
Stage 1, Yevgeniy Gidich
Prologue Tour of Ukraine, Stepan Astafyev
Stage 13 Tour of Qinghai Lake, Yevgeniy Gidich
Stage 2 Tour of Iran (Azerbaijan), Alexey Voloshin
2018
Grand Prix Side, Stepan Astafyev
Stage 2 Sri Lanka T-Cup, Yevgeniy Nepomnyachshiy
2019
Odessa Grand Prix, Matvey Nikitin
Stage 4 Tour of Iran (Azerbaijan), Igor Chzhan
2020
Grand Prix Velo Alanya, Daniil Pronskiy
Stage 1 Tour de Langkawi, Yevgeniy Fedorov

National champions
2015
 Kazakhstan Road Race, Oleg Zemlyakov

References

External links

UCI Continental Teams (Asia)
Cycling teams established in 2014
Cycling teams based in Kazakhstan
2014 establishments in Kazakhstan